Ro-102 was an Imperial Japanese Navy Ro-100-class submarine. Completed and commissioned in November 1942, she served in World War II, operating in the Solomon Islands, Rabaul, and New Guinea areas. She disappeared in May 1943 during her third war patrol.

Design and description
The Ro-100 class was a medium-sized, coastal submarine derived from the preceding Kaichū type. They displaced  surfaced and  submerged.

For surface running, the boats were powered by two  diesel engines, each driving one propeller shaft. When submerged each propeller was driven by a  electric motor. They could reach  on the surface and  underwater.

The boats were armed with four internal bow  torpedo tubes and carried a total of eight torpedoes. They were also armed with two single mounts for  Type 96 anti-aircraft guns or a single  L/40 AA gun.

Construction and commissioning

Ro-102 was laid down as Submarine No. 212 on 30 September 1941 by Kawasaki at Kobe, Japan. She had been renamed Ro-102 by the time she was launched on 17 April 1942. She was completed and commissioned on 17 November 1942.

Service history
Upon commissioning, Ro-102 was attached to the Yokosuka Naval District and was assigned to the Kure Submarine Squadron for workups. On 16 January 1943, she was reassigned to Submarine Squadron 7 in the 8th Fleet. She departed Yokosuka, Japan, on 25 January 1943, called at Truk from 8 to 11 February 1943, and arrived at Rabaul on New Britain on 15 February 1943.

First war patrol

Ro-102 got underway from Rabaul on 22 February 1943 for her first war patrol, assigned a patrol area south of New Guinea. The patrol was uneventful, and she returned to Rabaul on 15 March 1943.

Second war patrol

The patrol passed quietly, and she returned to Rabaul on 12 April 1943.

Third war patrol

On 29 April 1943, Ro-102 departed Rabaul to begin her third war patrol, bound for a patrol area southeast of Rabi, New Guinea, which she reached on 2 May 1943. She transmitted a message on 9 May 1943 from a position south of New Guinea reporting a lack of enemy activity in the area. The Japanese never heard from her again. On 15 May 1943, Ro-102 was ordered to return to Rabaul, but she did not acknowledge receipt of the order.

Loss

The circumstances of Ro-102′s loss remain a mystery. Other historians credit the U.S. Navy PT boats PT-150 and PT-152 with sinking Ro-102 off Lae, New Guinea, on the night of 13–14 May 1943, but the PT boats actually attacked the submarine  that night, and I-6 survived.

On 2 June 1943, the Imperial Japanese Navy declared Ro-102 to be presumed lost south of Rabi with all 42 men on board. The Japanese struck her from the Navy list on 15 July 1943.

Notes

References
 

Ro-100-class submarines
1942 ships
Ships built by Kawasaki Heavy Industries
World War II submarines of Japan
Japanese submarines lost during World War II
Maritime incidents in May 1943
Missing submarines of World War II
Ships lost with all hands
World War II shipwrecks in the Pacific Ocean